Harford Railway Cutting ( to ) is a  geological Site of Special Scientific Interest in Gloucestershire, notified in 1974. The site is listed in the 'Cotswold District' Local Plan 2001-2011 (on line) as a Regionally Important Geological Site (RIGS).

Location and geology
The site was formerly called Roundhill Railway Cuttings and lies within the Cotswold Area of Outstanding Natural Beauty near the River Windrush. The site exposures a critical Cotswold section in the Inferior Oolite of the Jurassic period spanning two stages and shows a sequence from the Aalenian Harford Sands and Tilestone of the Lower
Inferior Oolite through the Clypeus Grit. Research publications report the site of prime importance in showing one of the few continuous sections through the Middle and Upper Inferior Oolite. This has resulted in a significantly complete set of records of consecutive ammonite faunas.

References

SSSI Source
 Natural England SSSI information on the citation
 Natural England SSSI information on the Harford Railway Cutting unit

External links
 Natural England (SSSI information)

Sites of Special Scientific Interest in Gloucestershire
Sites of Special Scientific Interest notified in 1974
Cotswolds